In enzymology, a hydrogen dehydrogenase (NADP+) is an enzyme that catalyzes the chemical reaction

H2 + NADP+  H+ + NADPH

Thus, the two substrates of this enzyme are H2 and NADP+, whereas its two products are H+ and NADPH.

This enzyme belongs to the family of oxidoreductases, specifically those acting on hydrogen as donor with NAD+ or NADP+ as acceptor.  The systematic name of this enzyme class is hydrogen:NADP+ oxidoreductase. Other names in common use include NADP+-linked hydrogenase, NADP+-reducing hydrogenase, hydrogen dehydrogenase (NADP+), and simply hydrogenase (which is ambiguous).

Structural studies

As of late 2007, only one structure has been solved for this class of enzymes, with the PDB accession code .

References

 

EC 1.12.1
NADPH-dependent enzymes
Enzymes of known structure